The Canadian Gymnastics Championships is the annual national gymnastics competition held in Canada.  It features artistic gymnastics, rhythmic gymnastics, trampolining, and tumbling.

References

External links
 Gymnastics Canada

Gymnastics competitions
Gymnastics competitions in Canada